Priyanka Bose is an Indian actress and model. Active on stage and in films, she is best known for her role in the Italian film Gangor, among others. Priyanka started her film career with small roles in Love Sex aur Dhokha, Sorry Bhai!, Johnny Gaddar and Guzaarish. Her first film in a lead role was Gangor by the Italian director, Italo Spinelli in 2010. She gained recognition as an actress with her performance as a tribal woman in the film and went on to win the best actress award at the New Jersey Independent South Asian Film Festival.

Career
Priyanka starred as the lead actress in the 2010 film Gangor directed by Italo Spinelli. Adapted from Choli Ke Peeche, a short story by the acclaimed Indian writer Mahasweta Devi, Gangor won several awards at the New Jersey Independent South Asian Film Festival, including Best Actress for Bose.

In 2013, Priyanka appeared in the advertisement for Tanishq, a jewellery retail brand, as a girl with a daughter who remarries, which drew much attention to her. The ad  was hailed as "path-breaking", "courageous" and "unique", and became a talking point on Twitter and Facebook with thousands of hits on YouTube.

She toured the world for the play Nirbhaya, written and directed by the South African playwright Yael Farber, based on the 2012 Delhi gang rape. The much acclaimed play won the Scotsman Fringe First Award and Herald Angel Award at the Edinburgh Festival Fringe, and the Amnesty International Freedom of Expression Award.

Priyanka played the lead with Konkona Sen Sharma in the Bengali film, Shunyo Awnko, directed by Goutam Ghose. Gulaab Gang is another film where she appeared along with Madhuri Dixit and Juhi Chawla. Her performance has been noted in films in film festivals including Sold, by director Jeffery D Brown, Oass, directed by Abhinav Tiwari, and Oonga by Devashish Makhija.

Priyanka co-starred in Lion, directed by Garth Davis, along with Nicole Kidman, Nawazuddin Siddiqui and Dev Patel. She started a production company, PaapiPet Pictures, which has created short format films and music videos including Dark and delicious for Hipnotribe, and Bartender with Mikey Mcleary, besides one for Kailasa of Kailash Kher.

In 2016, Priyanka starred alongside Bhalchandra Kadam and Usha Naik in the Marathi film Half Ticket. A remake of the Tamil film Kaaka Muttai, Half Ticket was awarded the Ecumenical Jury Award at the 57th Zlin International Film Festival 2017 held in the Czech Republic. It was also picked for screening at the Indiwood Panorama Competition section at the 2nd edition of Indiwood Carnival 2016 in Hyderabad.

2016 - Present 
Bose performed with David Arquette in the Hollywood movie The MisEducation of Bindu directed by Prarthana Mohan, produced by Edward Timpe, which the Duplass Brothers executive produced. She appeared in the 2018 film Mortal directed by André Øvredal which co-starred Nat Wolff. She appeared in Season 3 of The Good Karma Hospital starring alongside Amanda Redman, Sagar Radia, James Floyd, and Amrita Acharia.

She alternates between Mumbai and Los Angeles to shoot for upcoming Indian and international productions.

She currently stars in Amazon Prime Video's fantasy series The Wheel of Time as the supporting character Alanna Mosvani.

Filmography

References

External links

Living people
Indian film actresses
Indian stage actresses
Indian web series actresses
Bengali actresses
Actresses in Hindi cinema
Actresses in Bengali cinema
Actresses in Marathi cinema
Year of birth missing (living people)
Delhi University alumni
Indian expatriate actresses in the United States
21st-century Indian actresses